Electrical Trades Union may refer to:

 Electrical Trades Union of Australia
 Electrical Trades Union (Ireland), now part of the Technical Engineering and Electrical Union
 Electrical Trades Union (UK), now part of Unite the Union